To Live on Love (Živjeti od ljubavi) is a 1973 Yugoslav Croatian film directed by Krešo Golik, starring , Rade Šerbedžija and Boris Dvornik.

The film was selected for preservation by the Croatian State Archives.

References

External links
 

1973 films
1970s Croatian-language films
Films directed by Krešo Golik
Croatian drama films
1973 drama films
Yugoslav drama films